Fărcășești is a commune in Gorj County, Oltenia, Romania. It is composed of seven villages: Fărcășești, Fărcășești-Moșneni, Peșteana de Jos, Rogojel, Roșia-Jiu, Timișeni and Valea cu Apă.

Natives
Victor Popescu

References

Communes in Gorj County
Localities in Oltenia